Ain't No Fairy Tale is the debut studio album by Anglo-American acoustic roots duo Boyd and Wain.

Background and release
The album was recorded in late 2009 and early 2010 at Goldtop Recording Studios in Chalk Farm, London. Originally planned as a demo album, it was picked up by Goldtop Records (aka Jungle Records) and finished as a full-length album.

Track listing

Credits
 Neil Brockbank – Producer, guitar, electric bass, vibes, glockenspiel
 Katy Boyd – vocals, guitar
 Benny Wain – vocals, fiddle
 Matt Radford – double bass
 Roy Dodds – drums

2010 debut albums